Phytomers are functional units of a plant, continually produced by root and shoot meristems throughout a plant's vegetative life-cycle.. Increases in a phytomer can be measured using the rate of phyllochron (rate of appearance of leaves on a shoot). Related to the phyllochron is the plastochron, which is the rate of leaf primordia initiation. Since many more leaf primordia are initiated than leaves develop, the plastochron develops at a much faster rate (sometimes as much as twice as quickly) as the phyllochron.

Initially, a young plant will only produce phytomers at its apical meristems but later in development, secondary meristems will begin to form and phytomers will be formed on this lateral plant growth.

Notes

References
 Howell, S.H. (1998). Molecular Genetics of Plant Development. Cambridge University Press 104. 
 McMaster, G. S. Phytomers, phyllochrons, phenology and temperate cereal development. J. Agric. Sci. 143, 137 (2005).

Plant anatomy